Gottfried Höch was chairman of the first Legal City Council of Ludwigshafen.

Hoech was the eldest son of a Grand Ducal official and had purposefully gained a respected position in the Baden administration as an expert on municipal finances. In 1841 he was Baden court economist in Mannheim and acquired on the  a Land lot, where in 1846 he built a house.

On  at the end of the Hecker uprising, during the Battle of Ludwigshafen democratic forces destroyed the warehouses by a cannonade.  Höch became chairman of the Local Commission of Ludwigsburg, which reached that the damages of the cannonade of Ludwigshafen, were compensated by the Kingdom of Bavaria.

References

1800 births
1872 deaths
Mayors of places in Rhineland-Palatinate